The 2012–13 ISAF Sailing World Cup was a series of sailing regattas staged during 2012–13 season. The series featured boats which feature at the Olympics and Paralympics.

Regattas

Results

2.4 Metre

Men's 470

Women's 470

Men's 49er

Women's 49erFX

Men's Finn

Men's Laser

Women's Laser Radial

Mixed Nacra 17

Men's RS:X

Women's RS:X

Sonar

References

External links
 Official website

2012-13
2012 in sailing
2013 in sailing